Hunter Cantrell (born July 10, 1995) is an American politician and former member of the Minnesota House of Representatives. A member of the Minnesota Democratic–Farmer–Labor Party (DFL), he represented District 56A in the southern Twin Cities metropolitan area.

Early life, education, and career
Cantrell was raised in Savage, Minnesota, where he attended Hidden Valley Elementary School, Eagle Ridge Middle School, and graduated from Burnsville High School in 2013. He attended Inver Hills Community College and the University of Minnesota, where he graduated from with a Bachelor of Arts in physiology.

Cantrell is a tutor for the Burnsville–Eagan–Savage School District and a home care worker.

Minnesota House of Representatives
Cantrell was first elected to the Minnesota House of Representatives in 2018, defeating Republican incumbent Drew Christensen. He did not run for re-election in 2020, instead campaigning for fellow DFL candidate Jessica Hanson.

Personal life
Cantrell resides in Savage, Minnesota. He is openly gay.

Cantrell was diagnosed with Hodgkin's lymphoma in May 2017, which is in remission after seven months of chemotherapy.

References

External links

 Official House of Representatives website
 Official campaign website

1995 births
Living people
Democratic Party members of the Minnesota House of Representatives
21st-century American politicians
LGBT state legislators in Minnesota
Gay politicians
People from Savage, Minnesota
University of Minnesota College of Liberal Arts alumni